An adenomyoepithelioma of the breast is a rare tumour in the breast composed of glandular elements (adeno-) and myoepithelial cells.  It is usually benign; however, there are reports of malignant behaviour.

The histomorphologic appearance can mimic invasive ductal carcinoma, the most common type of invasive breast cancer.

See also
Breast
Breast cancer
Epithelial-myoepithelial carcinoma

Additional images

References

External links 

Adenomyoepithelioma - micrograph (webpathology.com)

Breast neoplasia